The F Word  is an American competitive cooking reality show hosted by celebrity chef Gordon Ramsay. The series premiered on May 31, 2017 on Fox. It is based on the original British series of the same name.

Format
The F Word is a live hour-long cooking reality show in which families from across the U.S. compete as teams in a high-stakes cook off. Gordon Ramsay, celebrities, and various VIP guests judge the teams on their culinary skills.

In addition to the competition element, each episode will feature Ramsay talking with surprise guests in the dining room, as well as demos of the episode's featured dishes. He will also host live remote broadcasts and appear in special field segments with culinary experts and fans from around the country.

Cast

Host 
 Gordon Ramsay

Sous chefs

Red Team 

 Benjamin Kronick (season 1)

Black Team 
  Whitney Webster (season 1)

Maître d'hôtel 
 Kayla Strong (season 1)

Bartender 
 Charity Kay Johnston (season 1)

Episodes

Release

Broadcast
The F Word began airing on Fox during the 2016–17 television season.

References

External links

2017 American television series debuts
2017 American television series endings
2010s American cooking television series
Food reality television series
Fox Broadcasting Company original programming
American television series based on British television series
Television series by All3Media